Hinchinbrooke is a rural community in southern Quebec, in the Châteauguay Valley, in the MRC de Le Haut-Saint-Laurent. The population as of the Canada 2011 Census was 2,242.

History
Since the 1980 dissolution of Huntingdon County, Hinchinbrooke is within Le Haut-Saint-Laurent Regional County Municipality.

Geography
The municipality is situated along the Canada–United States border. It is one of the two southernmost communities in Quebec, along with Elgin, with their tripoint with New York on the Châteauguay River being the southernmost point in the province.

Communities
The following locations reside within the municipality's boundaries:
Athelstan – a hamlet situated on the western border with Elgin.
Brooklet – a hamlet situated in the southeast.
Herdman – a hamlet located along Quebec Route 202 in the south.
Parc Davignon – a cottage community along the US border.
Powerscourt – a hamlet situated on the southwest border with Elgin.
Rockburn – a hamlet located along Quebec Route 202 in the southeast.

Lakes & Rivers
The following waterways pass through or are situated within the municipality's boundaries:
Lac Moonlight – a small lake in the southwest.
Rivière Hinchinbrooke – runs along the municipality's western border.

Demographics

Population

Language

Economy
The primary industries in Hinchinbrooke are agriculture, with dairy cattle and apple farming being the most prevalent sub-sectors.

Notable residents
Sir William Hales Hingston, physician and mayor of Montreal from 1875 to 1877, was born in Hinchinbrooke.

See also
 Hinchinbrooke River
 Trout River
 Rivière aux Outardes
 Le Haut-Saint-Laurent Regional County Municipality
 Liste des municipalités locales de la Montérégie
 List of municipalities in Quebec

References

External links
Chateauguay Valley
Percy Covered Bridge
Powerscourt bridge

Municipalities in Quebec
Incorporated places in Le Haut-Saint-Laurent Regional County Municipality